George Valentine McInerney,  (February 14, 1857 – January 12, 1908) was a lawyer and politician in New Brunswick. He represented Kent in the House of Commons of Canada from 1892 to 1900 as a Liberal-Conservative member.

He was born on Valentine's Day in Kingston (later Rexton), the son of Owen McInerney and Mary McAuley. McInerney was educated at the College of Saint Joseph in Memramcook, Boston University and Harvard University. He was called to the bar in 1880 and became a criminal lawyer in Richibucto. He served as secretary-treasurer for Kent County from 1880 to 1900. In 1882, he married Christina, the daughter of Henry O'Leary. In 1894, he was named Queen's Counsel. McInerney also lectured at the Saint John Law School (now the law faculty of the University of New Brunswick).

He ran unsuccessfully for a seat in the federal parliament in 1878, 1882, 1883 and 1887 and again in 1890 for the provincial assembly. He was finally elected in an 1892 by-election. McInerney was defeated in bids for reelection in 1900 and 1904; he also ran unsuccessfully for a seat in the provincial assembly in 1903.

McInerney was trustee and, for a time, co-editor of the Catholic newspaper, the Freeman. He died in Saint John at the age of 50.

His son Ralph also served in the provincial assembly.

Electoral record

References 
Biography at the Dictionary of Canadian Biography Online
 

1857 births
1908 deaths
St. Joseph's College alumni
Harvard University alumni
Boston University alumni
Lawyers in New Brunswick
Canadian King's Counsel
Members of the House of Commons of Canada from New Brunswick
Conservative Party of Canada (1867–1942) MPs
Canadian Roman Catholics